Vladislav Zavadskiy (born 4 February 1996) is a Belarusian footballer who plays for Falko Cherkassy.

References

External links

1996 births
Living people
Belarusian footballers
Association football midfielders
FC Gorodeya players
FC Smolevichi players
FC Slavia Mozyr players
FC Krumkachy Minsk players
FC Oshmyany players